The Head Hunters is an album by American jazz drummer Chico Hamilton featuring performances recorded in 1968 and originally released on the Solid State label.

Reception
The Allmusic review by Scott Yanow called it an "intriguing if erratic set" stating "not essential, but it is a missing link in the long career of Chico Hamilton".

Track listing
All compositions by Chico Hamilton except as indicated
 "Guitar Willie" - 5:04
 "Reach and Grab It" - 5:30
 "I Found It" - 1:05
 "Head Hunters" - 4:25
 "Conglomerates" - 6:00
 "Ol' Man" (Jimmy Cheatham) - 3:12
 "Cee Ee Jaaa" - 3:25
 "Them's Good Ole Days" - 5:30

Personnel
Chico Hamilton - drums
Steve Potts - alto saxophone
Russ Andrews - tenor saxophone
Robert Ashton - baritone saxophone
Ray Nance - violin
Eric Gale - guitar 
Jan Arnet - bass

References 

Solid State Records (jazz label) albums
Chico Hamilton albums
1969 albums